The war of the stop signs was an event that happened on the  (Spain) / D-68 (France) road that connects the town and Spanish exclave of Llívia with Puigcerdà (Spanish border city next to France) between the early 1970s and the 1980s.

Llívia is a Spanish town in the province of Girona, Catalonia, which is completely surrounded by French territory since 1660 (Treaty of the Pyrenees). After the third Bayonne Treaty, signed in 1866, it was established that the path (now road) that connected Llívia with Puigcerdà was of "free movement" to ease the crossing to some grazing lands the town owns inside French territory.

When the French government built two roads in the early 1970s that intersected the Llívia to Puigcerdà road, they put some stop signs that forced people to stop and yield to the French roads. It was at this moment that the people from Llivia started to repeatedly tear down the stop signs over the years, stating that they violated the "free movement" of the road that the treaty established. Finally, in the early 1980s, the Spanish government financed the construction of a bridge over one of the French roads, while the French government changed the priority rules of the second crossing so the oncoming road had to yield to the N-154 / D-68.

Only cars with a Spanish registration plate could use the Llívia to Puigcerdà road until 1995, when the Schengen Treaty was put into place.

References 

France–Spain relations
Traffic signs
Cerdanya (comarca)